William Neil Adger (born 1964) is Professor of Human Geography at the University of Exeter.

He was educated at the University of Edinburgh (MA Economics), Wye College, University of London (MSc Agricultural Economics) and the University of East Anglia (PhD, 1998). He was awarded a Philip Leverhulme Prize in 2001 and is a Thomson Reuters Highly Cited Scientist. He has been a Co-ordinating Lead Author for the Intergovernmental Panel on Climate Change.

References

1964 births
Living people
Alumni of the University of Edinburgh
Alumni of the University of East Anglia
Academics of the University of Exeter
British geographers
Environmental scientists
Intergovernmental Panel on Climate Change lead authors
Alumni of Wye College